Primate of New Zealand is a title held by a bishop who leads the Anglican Church in Aotearoa, New Zealand and Polynesia. Since 2006, the Senior Bishop of each tikanga (Māori, Pākehā, Pasefika) serves automatically as one of three co-equal Primates-and-Archbishops. Previously, one of these three would be Presiding Bishop and the other two Co-Presiding Bishops; and before that there was only one Primate.

Bishop and Metropolitan
George Selwyn was consecrated Bishop of New Zealand on 17 October 1841: he was the sole bishop over a very large territory, including all New Zealand and very many South Pacific islands. In his lifetime, as the Anglican ministry in New Zealand grew, that one diocese was divided several times: by letters patent dated 22 September 1858, Selwyn was made metropolitan bishop over the other dioceses and called Bishop of New Zealand and Metropolitan. By 1868, New Zealand had seven dioceses, Selwyn had come to be referred to as "the Primate", and the General Synod constitution as amended that year used this term.

Primate and Metropolitan
At the same Synod, Selwyn having announced his intention to resign, a Statute was adopted for the election of the Primate (and Metropolitan) from among the bishops diocesan (who retained their See) and Harper, Bishop of Christchurch was so elected (to take office upon Selwyn's resignation). The same statute created the role of Senior Bishop — being the bishop consecrated first (excluding any former primate), and Acting Primate in certain circumstances. Primates of this era occasionally used the style Archbishop of New Zealand; and gained the archiepiscopal style the Most Reverend between the 5th General Synod (1871) and the 6th (1874). An attempt was made in the 21st Synod (1919) to make the Bishop of Wellington ex officio Primate and Metropolitan; this failed in the 22nd Synod (1922), which did, however, amend the Canons and officially grant the title Primate and Archbishop of New Zealand.

Primate and Archbishop
Throughout the 20th century, the church in New Zealand developed an understanding for the different cultures within it. In 1925, the Diocese of Polynesia began as a missionary diocese of the church. In 1928, the first Bishop of Aotearoa, ministering to the Māori, was consecrated as suffragan bishop to the Bishop of Waiapu. In the 1970s, Melanesia became a separate ecclesiastical province from New Zealand, and the Bishop of Aotearoa became a full-ranking diocesan, with a diocese covering all of New Zealand. Under the primacy of Brian Davis, Polynesia became a fully-fledged diocese and a review of church structures was begun.

In 1992, the General Synod of the church set up five hui amorangi, or regional bishoprics, to serve under the Bishop of Aotearoa. The Church of the Province of New Zealand also adopted its current name, the Anglican Church in Aotearoa, New Zealand and Polynesia, to demonstrate its ownership by the three tikanga. The same Synod limited the Primate to a ten-year term, with re-election to one further four-year term.

Primate with Co-Presiding Bishops
The 53rd General Synod (1998) reduced the Primate's term from five General Synods (i.e. 10 years) to three (i.e. 6 years); removed the additional style "Archbishop" from the Primacy in favour of "Presiding Bishop"; and conferred the style "Co-Presiding Bishops / nga Pīhopa Aporei" on the Senior Bishops of the two tikanga besides the Primate's, while enjoining them to work closely with the Primate / te Pīhopa Mātāmua and Presiding Bishop.

The 2004 General Synod passed a further Primacy statute which: reinstated the honorific "Archbishop" (removing "Presiding Bishop") to the Primate; required the elected Primate to resign their other See(s); and, anticipating the coming changes, limited the next Primate's term to two years (renewable once). Whakahuihui Vercoe duly stepped down at the end of that two-year term as Primate in 2006, when the church decided that three bishops shall share the position and style of archbishop, each representing one of the three tikanga, or cultural streams of the church: Te Pīhopatanga o Aotearoa (the Bishopric of Aotearoa, serving Māori), the Dioceses in New Zealand (serving Pākehā), and the Diocese of Polynesia.

Shared Primacy
Further changes to the office of primate were its limitation to a two-year term, to allow for greater participation in leadership, and its establishment as a triumvirate of bishops. For the transitional period between the decision at 2006 General Synod and the completion of the necessary legislation, Turei was Primate and Archbishop, and Moxon and Bryce his Co-Presiding Bishops; but they began to act as if co-equal primates, including use of "Archbishop" and the Most Reverend. Since 2008, Te Pīhopa o Aotearoa, the diocesan Bishop of Polynesia and the Senior Bishop of the New Zealand (i.e. tikanga Pākehā) Dioceses have each — co-equally — been ex officio Primate and Archbishop; each one is elected by a body representing their whole tikanga. Te Hīnota Whānui/General Synod 2020 reaffirmed the three-tikanga and co-primacy arrangements.

References

Anglican church 2005–2006 clerical directory (PDF) page 4
Holy Trinity Cathedral list

External links
The official website of Anglican Church in Aotearoa
Historical documents on Anglicanism in New Zealand

Anglicanism in New Zealand